Sir Richard Whitbourne (1561 – 1635) was an English colonist, mariner and writer.

Richard Whitbourne was born near Bishopsteignton in south Devon, England, where he was baptised on 20 June 1561. Whilst apprenticed to a merchant adventurer of Southampton, he sailed extensively around Europe and twice to Newfoundland. He served in a ship of his own against the Great Armada under Lord Admiral Thomas Howard, 1st Earl of Suffolk. He spent the next thirty years in cod fishing off Newfoundland. He assisted the pirates Peter Easton and Henry Mainwaring to seek pardons from James I of England.

Asked by William Vaughan to govern his colony at Renews in Newfoundland, he did so from 1618 until 1620 when Vaughan abandoned the venture. Whitbourne was sent to establish law and order in the colony, he was the first to hold a court of justice in North America at Trinity in 1615.

In 1620, Whitbourne published A Discourse and Discovery of New-found-land in order to promote colonisation on the island.

Between 1589 (at latest) and 1627 Whitbourne had a house at or near Exmouth on the south Devon coast of England. Perhaps dying on a foreign voyage, his burial place has yet to be confirmed of either his place of birth or at St. Saviour's Church, Southwark, London.

See also
Newfoundland governors
Whitbourne, Newfoundland and Labrador

References and notes

External links
Government House The Governorship of Newfoundland and Labrador
Biography at the Dictionary of Canadian Biography Online
A Discourse and Discovery of New-found-land by Richard Whitbourne (1620)

1579 births
1635 deaths
Governors of Newfoundland Colony
Persons of National Historic Significance (Canada)
16th-century English writers
16th-century male writers
17th-century English writers
People from Teignbridge (district)
English explorers
17th-century explorers
English knights
People from Renews-Cappahayden
Kingdom of England people in Newfoundland
17th-century English male writers
English sailors